The Coalyard Miniature Railway, opened in 1988, and relaid in 1990 as a  gauge railway, operates in the grounds of the Severn Valley Railway’s Kidderminster Town Station.

History
The track was unusual in being constructed of continuously welded rails.

In 1990 a new  gauge aluminium track was laid and then gradually extended until it reached the far end of the Kidderminster Town Station car park. The original line was then removed, making space for a new footpath from the Severn Valley Railway car park to the station. The line originally used wooden sleepers but when these wore out they were replaced with plastic sleepers.

References

External links
Photo
PNP-Railways
Cromar White Railways
Parkside Railways
Station Road Steam

7¼ in gauge railways in England
Miniature railways in the United Kingdom
Severn Valley Railway
Railway lines opened in 1988